Richard Louis Evans (March 23, 1906 – November 1, 1971) was a member of the Quorum of the Twelve Apostles of the Church of Jesus Christ of Latter-day Saints (LDS Church) (1953–71); the president of Rotary International (1966–67); and the writer, producer, and announcer of Music and the Spoken Word (1929–71).

Biography
Evans was born in Salt Lake City, Utah. In the late 1920s, he served as a missionary for the LDS Church in the United Kingdom. While on his mission, Evans served as associate editor of the Millennial Star, a periodical published by the mission. He received bachelor's and master's degrees from the University of Utah. There, he joined Pi Kappa Alpha.

His master's degree was in economics. Over the years he served on the boards of directors of several companies.

In the late 1920s, he took a job with KSL radio as an announcer and script writer. He was also employed as the managing editor of the Improvement Era starting in 1936. He worked with the era for 30 years and eventually became its senior editor. He was also closely involved with the changes that led to the replacement of the Improvement Era with the Ensign, New Era and Friend in 1971.

In 1937, Evans' book A Century of "Mormonism" in Great Britain was published with a copyright by Heber J. Grant, as trustee-in-trust for LDS Church. Evans also served for a time as the president of the Temple Square Mission.

Evans may have been best known as the announcer for the weekly Mormon Tabernacle Choir radio broadcast, Music and the Spoken Word: every week, he wrote, produced, and announced the radio broadcasts, including a short inspirational message. His involvement in these weekly broadcasts spanned from its inception in 1929 until his death in 1971.

Evans' voice was familiar to Latter-day Saints as the narrator of various church productions, most notably Man's Search for Happiness. He also introduced the Salt Lake City choir's contribution to Bing Crosby's annual "Christmas Sing with Bing" radio broadcasts during the 1950s, and is heard on the 1956 Decca LP of the same name, which featured the previous year's "Christmas Sing" edition.

Evans served as president of the University of Utah alumni association for three terms and as a member of its board for 12 years. He also served for a time as a member of the Utah State Board of Higher Education.

Evans first became a church general authority in 1938 when he was called as a member of the First Council of the Seventy. Evans was ordained an apostle on October 8, 1953, following the death of Albert E. Bowen.

Evans was the last LDS Church apostle to have facial hair while in office, wearing a neatly trimmed mustache until the mid-1960s.

Evans died at age 65 on November 1, 1971. The vacancy in the Quorum of the Twelve Apostles from his death was filled by Marvin J. Ashton. Evans was buried at Salt Lake City Cemetery.

Known for his ability to reach across religious differences, the Richard L. Evans Chair of Religious Understanding at Brigham Young University was created in his honor on November 1, 1972

Published works

Notes

References

1906 births
1971 deaths
American Latter Day Saint writers
Apostles (LDS Church)
Writers from Salt Lake City
Presidents of the Seventy (LDS Church)
University of Utah alumni
Burials at Salt Lake City Cemetery
American general authorities (LDS Church)
Rotary International leaders
American broadcasters
20th-century American writers
People from Salt Lake City
Latter Day Saints from Utah
Tabernacle Choir